The voiced uvular nasal is a type of consonantal sound, used in some spoken languages.

The uvular nasal is a rare sound cross-linguistically, occurring as a phoneme in only a small handful of languages. It is complex in terms of articulation, and also highly marked, as it is inherently difficult to produce a nasal articulation at the uvular point of contact. This difficulty can be said to account for the marked rarity of this sound among the world's languages.

The uvular nasal most commonly occurs as a conditioned allophone of other sounds, for example as an allophone of  before a uvular plosive as in Quechua, or as an allophone of /q/ before another nasal consonant as in Selkup. However, it has been reported to exist as an independent phoneme in a small number of languages. Examples include the Klallam language, Tagalog language the Tawellemmet and Ayr varieties of Tuareg Berber, the Rangakha dialect of Khams Tibetan, at least two dialects of the Bai language, and the Papuan language Mapos Buang. In Mapos Buang and in the Bai dialects, it contrasts phonemically with a velar nasal. The syllable-final nasal in Japanese was traditionally said to be realized as a uvular nasal when utterance-final, but empirical studies have disputed this claim.

There is also the pre-uvular nasal in some languages such as Yanyuwa, which is articulated slightly more front compared with the place of articulation of the prototypical uvular nasal, though not as front as the prototypical velar nasal. The equivalent X-SAMPA symbols are N\_+ and N_-, respectively.

Features

Features of the voiced uvular nasal:

Occurrence

See also
 Index of phonetics articles

Notes

References

External links
 

Uvular consonants
Nasal consonants
Pulmonic consonants
Voiced consonants